Hempelmann or Hempelman is a surname. Notable people with the surname include:
Josef Hempelmann (1893–1967), German architect and politician
Louis Hempelmann (1914–1993), American physician
David Hempleman-Adams (born 1956), British industrialist and adventurer
John Hempleman (1933–2019), New Zealand motorcycle road racer